, formerly , was an amateur Japanese football club based in Moriyama, Shiga. They were members of the Japan Football League (JFL). The club formed in 2007 from a merger of two Sagawa Express corporation football clubs in JFL; Sagawa Express Tokyo S.C. and Sagawa Express Osaka S.C. The Tokyo side had been in JFL since 2001 and the Osaka side since 2002. The announcement of the merger was on September 14, 2006 and its base would be moved to Shiga prefecture, the company's corporate base. Blue and silver were their team colours. Their home stadium was the Sagawa Express Moriyama Stadium in Moriyama, Shiga.

This merger of two strong teams in JFL proved successful. In their first year of competition in JFL they won the championship and eight of their players selected in JFL Best Eleven 2007. With the promotion of F.C. Mi-O Biwako Kusatsu to JFL, there will be Shiga derby matches in 2008 season. F.C. Mi-O also formed from Sagawa Express Kyoto S.C in 2005. Their first derby match will be played on March 16 at Moriyama and it is also the opening match of the 2008 season.

In 2008 the name of the team changed to Sagawa Shiga FC in a bid to get the support of the local community.

On 16 October 2012, it was reported that Sagawa Shiga had notified JFL organization about their intention of withdrawal from JFL as of the end of 2012 season. The club currently maintains a football academy.

Club records

See also
 Sagawa Express Osaka S.C.
 Sagawa Express Tokyo S.C.

References

External links
  Football Academy Official Website

Defunct football clubs in Japan
Sports teams in Shiga Prefecture
2007 establishments in Japan
2012 disestablishments in Japan
Japan Football League clubs
Association football clubs established in 2007
Association football clubs disestablished in 2012